The Abbott-Detroit was an American luxury automobile manufactured between 1909 and 1919. It was designed by John G. Utz, designer of the Chalmers, who had previously worked for Olds Motor Works and the Autocar Company. Considered powerful and well-designed, the Abbott sported a Continental engine. The cars were guaranteed for life by 1913, when electric lighting and starting had been standardized.

Total production for the 1911 model year was expected to be 3000 cars. By 1916, production of these cars had reached 15 to 20 units a day, so the company moved from Detroit to a larger facility in Cleveland. This proved too stressful on the company's finances, and they declared bankruptcy in April 1918.

Dealerships 
The company opened a dealership in Kansas City, Missouri around June 1910. The newly constructed building was located at 321 Admiral Boulevard, on the southeast corner of Admiral Boulevard and McGee Street. H. F. Worth was the sales manager at the time. His goal was to "place five hundred cars in Kansas, Missouri and Oklahoma."

Models

Models that Abbott-Detroit offered included:

34/45 hp (25/30 kW) Fore Door Roadster
Limousine (1913 model)
44/40 hp (33/37 kW) Battleship Roadster
34 hp (25 kW) Model F
31 hp (24 kW) Model L
22 hp (20 kW) Model K
30 hp Fore Door Roadster ($1500 in 1910)
30 hp Fore Door Demi Tonneau ($1650 in 1910)

Prices ranged from US$1700 for the Fore Door to US$3050 for the Limousine.

See also
Brass Era car
List of defunct automobile manufacturers

References

Car brands
Veteran vehicles
Defunct motor vehicle manufacturers of the United States
Motor vehicle manufacturers based in Michigan
Defunct manufacturing companies based in Detroit
Defunct manufacturing companies based in Ohio
American companies established in 1909
Vehicle manufacturing companies established in 1909
Vehicle manufacturing companies disestablished in 1919
1909 establishments in Michigan
1916 establishments in Ohio
1919 disestablishments in Ohio